The International Belgrade Book Fair is one of the oldest and most important literary events in the region. Its basic objective is enabling publishers, authors, booksellers, librarians, book distributors, multimedia companies and other participants to establish contacts, exchange experiences, do business deals and establish other forms of business and cultural cooperation. All publishers from Serbia and the most prominent ones from the region feature at the Fair their annual publishing production.

In addition to the publishing program, an extensive side event one is organized at the Fair, as well: conferences, round table conferences, meetings with authors, public discussion panels and workshops. For the visitors, the Book Fair is an opportunity to find at one place and buy at special prices the books they are interested in, as well as to meet their favorite authors and discover the new ones, attending one of many programs.
 
The Book Fair is the most visited cultural event in Serbia. In 2019, there were 184,532 visitors at the Fair. Based upon the organizer's data, in 2019, the Fair was followed by 1,300 accredited journalists.

According to a research conducted by the Strategic Marketing among Belgrade citizens in 2010, the Book Fair was proclaimed the greatest brand of Belgrade.

On the occasion of the Anniversary – sixty years since its founding, Belgrade Book Fair is the winner of the award of the Cultural and Educational Community of Belgrade The Golden Link 2015 for the permanent contribution to Belgrade culture.

The Belgrade Book Fair was set up by the City of Belgrade, it is managed by the Book Fair Council and the Executive Organizer is the company Belgrade Fair. The Fair is traditionally held in October, in Belgrade Fair Halls 1, 1A, 2 and 4, at the space of about 30,000 square meters and it lasts for eight days.

In 2021. Belgrade Book Fair will take place on September 11th to 19th.

History 

The first Yugoslav Book Fair was held in 1956, at Zagreb Fair, under the auspices of the President Josip Broz Tito. It was attended by the most important writers of the country, among them also Ivo Andrić and Miroslav Krleža. About 12,000 books of all Yugoslav publishers were displayed there, but also of those from Austria, Czechoslovakia, the Netherlands, UK, France, Italy, China, Hungary, East and West Germany, Poland, Romania, USA, Soviet Union and Switzerland.

In the following year, 1957, the Fair was moved to Belgrade, where the construction of a modern fair ground was completed. The books were displayed by about 60 local and 36 international publishers, from 16 countries in Europe, America and Asia. It was agreed that the International Book Fair should include the catalog and last for six days. The Fair was held at the end of October, in Belgrade Fair Hall 3 and on the occasion of the Fair festivity, the Book and the World magazine was initiated, as well. The first Belgrade Book Fair was opened by Mr. Rodoljub Čolaković, the Vice President of the Federal Executive Council at that time.

The International Book Fair in Belgrade gathered annually an increasing number of publishers from the former Yugoslavia and the whole world, so that after the Frankfurt and Warsaw Book Fairs, it became the largest meeting point of the publishing staff from Europe, America, Asia and Africa. The East and West cultures met in Belgrade and still meet there.

Prizes 

Several prizes are awarded during the Belgrade Book Fair: 
Publisher of the Year, Publishing Project of the Year, The Best Children’s Book, The Most Beautiful Book, The Most Beautiful Children’s Book,  The Best Young Book Designer, The Best Publisher from the Diaspora, Special Recognition for the Contribution within Science. All publishers from Serbia and Diaspora being exhibitors at the Fair may compete for the prizes.

In addition to these prizes, the Dositej Obradović Prize has also been awarded since 2007, to an international publisher, for his continuous contribution to publishing and promotion of Serbian literature. So far, the Prize winners were the Austrian publisher Wieser Verlag from Klagenfurt (2007), French publisher Gaia Editions from Bordeaux (2008), Hungarian publisher Jelenkor from Pécs (2009), Italian publisher Zandonai from Rovereto (2010), Bulgarian publisher Siela from Sofia (2011) and Slovak publisher Kaligram from Bratislava (2012), Ukrainian publisher "Piramid" from Lviv (2013), Macedonian publisher "Ikona" from Skopje (2014), Spanish publisher "Acantilado" from Barselona (2015), Russian publisher "Book Center Rudomino" from Moscow (2016), Austrian publisher "Pauls Zsolnay" from Wienna (2017), Italian publisher "Lit Edizioni" from Rome (2018) and Greek publisher "Kostaniotis Editions" from Athens (2019).

Features

The Guest of Honor Country

Since 2002, Belgrade Fair has got also its Guest of Honor – the country with especially presented literature and publishing production. The Guest of Honor Country gets an outstanding location in the Hall 2  within the Book Fair. The Guest of Honor has the opportunity of presenting its publishing and culture at its stand as well as in the Fair's promotion conference halls, within the author meeting program, lectures and trade seminars.

The Guest of Honor may feature at the Fair the authors from its country, translators, publishers, distributors, as well as all those connected to the book in different ways. Establishing strong and live cultural connections is one of the most important event objectives and in this respect the Guest of Honor institution is extremely important.

The previous Guests of Honors were Norway (2002), Canada (2003), France (2004), UK (2005), United States (2006), Italy (2007), Japan (2008), Greece (2009), Sweden (2010), Portuguese language (2011), Hungary (2012), Poland (2013), China (2014), Russia (2015) and Iran (2016), Litarture in German Language (Germany, Austria, Switzerland and Liechtenstein) - 2017, Kingdom of Morocco (2018) and Arab Republic of Egypt (2019).

The School Day
The so-called School Day has been organized at the Fair since 2005, which encompasses organized visits of pupils, students, professors and school librarians, as well as many side event programs intended for them.

Notable authors

The Book Fair includes all major authors from Serbia and many respected regional writers. The event is traditionally opened by renowned local authors. In the first decade of the 20th century, the Fair was festively opened by Svetlana Velmar Janković, Vida Ognjenović, David Albahari, Milovan Danojlić, Ljubomir Simović, Goran Petrović, Dušan Kovačević, Dragoslav Mihailović, Dragan Velikić, László Végel, Svetislav Basara, Radmila Lazić, Ljubivoje Ršumović, Milosav Tešić, Emir Kusturica, dr Dragan Stanić, Miro Vuksanović, Matija Bećković and Milovan Vitezović.

The Fair is annually visited by at least one contemporary worldwide known writer. Among others, the Fair was visited by Alain Robbe-Grillet, Erica Jong, Natsuki Ikezawa, Claudio Magris, Lyudmila Ulitskaya, Charles Simic, Elizabeth Abbott, Tony Parsons, Peter Handke, Patrick Besson, Ǻsa Lind, Thanassis Valtinos, Flaire Yegy, Gish Jen, Naim Kattan, Geir Pollen, Evgeny Vodolazkin, Erlend Loe, Zahar Prilepin ...

Quotes

References

External links 

 

Recurring events established in 1956
Culture in Belgrade
Book fairs in Serbia
Tourist attractions in Belgrade
Autumn events in Serbia